Alice Hyde may refer to:

Alice Clary Earle Hyde (1876-1943), American botanical artist and conservationist 
Alice Hyde Medical Center, a medical facility in Malone, New York, United States